Portrait of Charles Marcotte (also known as Marcotte d'Argenteuil) is an 1810 oil on canvas painting by the French Neoclassical artist Jean-Auguste-Dominique Ingres, completed during the artists first stay in Rome. Charles Marie Jean Baptiste Marcotte (1773-1864) was a long term friend, loyal supporter and adviser to Ingres, and commissioned a number of portraits of his family and friends, as well as works such as Odalisque with Slave (1839). He was 23 years in age when the portrait was painted, and serving as inspector general for Waters and Forests in Napoleonic Rome.

Although handsome, and possessing strong bone structure, he is portrayed as dour and serious, dressed in an imposing military uniform, and given a stern facial expression, with tightly pursed lips, which are turned down at the corners. A number of art historians have noted how his stiffness resemble Ingres' own early self-portraits, particularly that of 1804. 

Marcotte stands against a plain grey-green background, leaning against a table draped with a red cloth. His stiff, starched white and yellow neck collar appears tight and restrictive. He wears a blue carrick with a cape and velvet collar, over a white shirt and yellow waistcoat. Affectionately, his hair appears ruffled, which somewhat breaks the overall grim and morose tone. Special attention is given to his claw-like right hand, with its long sinuous fingers, the shape of which is echoed by the tassels protruding from the scroll beside him.

Marcotte commissioned the portrait as a gift to his mother. He did not like the final painting, finding it too stern, a fact Ingres asked him to keep to himself. It remained in his possession until his death in 1864, after which it passed to his son Joseph Marcotte, and then to his widow, and to his daughter Élisabeth Pougin de la Maisonneuve until 1935. It was acquired by Samuel H. Kress in 1949, and gifted to the National Gallery of Art in 1952. 

Ingres signed and dated the painting on the lower right, over the red cloth.

Notes

Sources

Rosenblum, Robert. Ingres. London: Harry N. Abrams, 1990. 
Conisbee, Philip. Portraits by Ingres: Image of an Epoch. New York: Metropolitan Museum of Art, 1999.

External links
NGA catalogue entry

Marcotte
1810 paintings
Collections of the National Gallery of Art